Dollar General Corporation is an American chain of variety stores headquartered in Goodlettsville, Tennessee. As of January 1, 2023, Dollar General operates 18,774 stores in the continental United States.

The company began in 1939 as a family-owned business called J.L. Turner and Son in Scottsville, Kentucky, owned by James Luther Turner and Cal Turner. In 1955, the name changed to Dollar General Corporation and in 1968 the company went public on the New York Stock Exchange. Fortune 500 recognized Dollar General in 1999 and in 2020 reached #112. Dollar General has grown to become one of the most profitable stores in the rural United States with revenue reaching around $27 billion in 2019.

History

J.L. Turner and Son: 1939–1964

Dollar General has its origin in Scottsville, Kentucky, with James Luther "J.L." Turner and his son Cal Turner. James Turner's father died in an accident in 1902 when James was only 11. James quit school to work on the family farm, helping to provide for his mother and siblings, and subsequently never completed his education. After two unsuccessful attempts at retailing, James became a traveling dry goods salesman for a Nashville wholesale grocer. James left the sales job after 10 years and settled his family in Scottsville, Kentucky. During the Great Depression, he began buying and liquidating bankrupt general stores. James' only child Cal Turner accompanied his father to these closeouts at a young age, gaining valuable business knowledge and skills.

In October 1939, James and Cal opened J.L. Turner and Son with an initial investment of $5,000 each. The switch to retailing resulted in annual sales above $2 million by the early 1950s. By the mid-1950s Turner had 35 department stores in Kentucky and Tennessee. In 1955, Cal Turner developed his idea of a retail store selling goods for a dollar, based on the Dollar Days promotions held at other department stores, by converting Turner's Department Store in Springfield, Kentucky, into the first Dollar General Store. In 1964 J.L. Turner died leaving his son Cal Turner to succeed him.

1968–2002
The company Cal Turner co-founded went public as Dollar General Corporation in 1968, posting annual sales of more than $40 million and net income in excess of $1.5 million. In 1977, Cal Turner, Jr., who joined the company in 1965 as the third generation Turner, succeeded his father as president of Dollar General. Cal Jr. led the company until his retirement in 2002. Under his leadership, the company grew to more than 6,000 stores and $6 billion in sales. In 1997 a distribution center was established in South Boston, Virginia.

In 2000, Dollar General opened a new corporate headquarters in Goodlettsville, Tennessee. By the end of 2000, sales at Dollar General exceeded $4 billion. The distribution center in Homerville, Georgia, was closed in April 2000 and operations were moved to a new distribution center in Alachua, Florida.

Cal Jr. retired in 2002 and was succeeded by David Perdue on April 2, 2003.

2003–present
Dollar General entered the grocery market with the establishment of Dollar General Market in 2003. In 2004, Dollar General expanded to low-cost Asian markets by opening a sourcing office in Hong Kong.

On June 21, 2007, CEO David Perdue announced his resignation leaving David Bere as interim CEO. One month later, all shares of Dollar General stock were acquired by private equity investors for $22 per share. An investment group consisting of affiliates of Kohlberg Kravis Roberts (KKR), GS Capital Partners (an affiliate of Goldman Sachs), Citigroup Private Equity and other co-investors completed an acquisition of Dollar General Corporation for $6.9 billion.

As a part of the transition to a privately held company, Dollar General assessed each location at the end of its lease against a model known as "EZ Stores". This assessment included evaluating whether the location had a loading dock, garbage dumpsters, adequate parking, and acceptable profitability. Stores that did not pass this evaluation were relocated or closed. Over 400 stores were closed as part of this initiative.

Dollar General filed on August 20, 2009, for an initial public offering of up to $750 Million turning the company once again into a publicly traded corporation. In 2013, Dollar General started selling cigarettes in response to its competitor Family Dollar selling cigarettes in 2012. Dollar General's 12th distribution center opened on May 31, 2014, in Bethel, Pennsylvania, to serve the northeast and midwest stores. On August 18, 2014, Dollar General lodged a competing bid of $9.7 billion against Dollar Tree for Family Dollar. The bid was rejected on August 20, 2014, by the Family Dollar board, which said it would proceed with the deal with Dollar Tree.

On June 3, 2015, Chief Operating Officer Todd Vasos replaced Rick Dreiling as chief executive. Dreiling remained as senior advisor and chairman until his retirement in January 2016. Dollar General's 13th distribution center opened in San Antonio, Texas, on June 6, 2016, with a local investment of $100 million and the creation of over 500 jobs. In September 2015, the Janesville City Council, in Wisconsin, approved an agreement to bring a Dollar General distribution center to the town. The center created more than 500 jobs in the area and became the 14th Dollar General distribution center.

On September 15, 2016, Dollar General announced plans to hire 10,000 new employees and open 900 new stores in fiscal 2016 and 1,000 in fiscal 2017. Dollar General had operated 13,000 stores as of August 2016.

In January 2017, Dollar General opened a concept store in Nashville called DGX. The DGX store concept focuses on urban shoppers and is geared toward instant consumption items such as a coffee station and a soda fountain. The following month another DGX store opened in Raleigh, North Carolina, and in September a third DGX opened in Philadelphia. As of May 2020, Dollar General operated 12 DGX locations in nine states

In Jackson, Georgia, Dollar General opened its 15th distribution center in fall 2017 to serve stores in Georgia and the surrounding states. In 2017, Dollar General began construction for its 16th distribution center in Amsterdam, New York. The distribution center was to cost $91 million and was expected to create 400 jobs in Montgomery County, New York. Dollar General planned to open 900 new stores in 2018. The distribution center became fully operation in 2019. Also in 2017, Dollar General acquired stores from Dollar Express, a spinoff from the Family Dollar-Dollar Tree deal, and converted the store.

In September 2019, Dollar General celebrated the grand opening of its 16,000th store, in Panama City, Florida, following damage sustained from Hurricane Michael in October 2018. To commemorate the opening, Dollar General presented two $16,000 checks in partnership with Kellogg's to two local elementary schools displaced from the hurricane.

On December 5, 2019, Dollar General announced FY 2020 plans that include the opening of 1,000 new stores, remodeling of 1,500 mature stores and relocation of 80 stores. In February 2020, Dollar General announced plans to create 8,000 net new career opportunities in fiscal year 2020. Dollar General expanded to 46 states in 2020 with the addition of new stores in Wyoming in March and Washington in April.

In late May 2020, two Dollar General stores were destroyed by arson during the George Floyd protests in Minneapolis–Saint Paul and three others had property damage.

In Fall 2020, Dollar General opened its first pOpshelf in Nashville, Tennessee selling mostly items costing less than $5. By the end of 2021, the company planned 50 free-standing popshelf locations and 25 store-within-a-store locations.

In April 2021, the company said it is planning to hire 20,000 employees, which is less than the number of employees hired in 2020 (50,000).

In March 2022, Dollar General opened its first store in the state of Idaho, located in Athol.

Major sponsorships

Auto racing

For several years, Dollar General has had a connection with motorsports, particularly in NASCAR. The company has previously been a primary sponsor for Joe Gibbs Racing. Dollar General sponsored Brian Vickers in the Nationwide Series in 2013. Dollar General became a primary sponsor for Matt Kenseth in the Sprint Cup Series starting in 2013. Dollar General and Turner (formerly Braun Racing) have been partnered together since 2008, with the team previously sponsoring cars for Frank Cicci Racing and Kevin Harvick Incorporated. In 2010, Dollar General sponsored some races in the Camping World Truck Series for Kyle Busch Motorsports with Kyle Busch in the No. 18 Toyota Tundra and sponsored Kyle Busch's Motorsports No. 51 Toyota Tundra for four races in 2014 with Busch driving three and Erik Jones driving one. Dollar General was the title sponsor for Nationwide Series races held in Charlotte every fall, Chicagoland every summer, and Phoenix in the spring. On May 23, 2016, Dollar General announced they would withdraw its sponsorship from NASCAR at the end of the 2016 season.

Dollar General is also active in the IndyCar Series since 2008, serving as the primary sponsor for owner/driver Sarah Fisher's Sarah Fisher Racing team. In 2010, both Fisher and Graham Rahal drove part-time for the team finishing 9th at the Honda Grand Prix of St. Petersburg. Fisher also led the field at the Peak Antifreeze & Motor Oil Indy 300 at Chicagoland Speedway. In 2011, Dollar General continued to sponsor Sarah Fisher Racing, the team was still part-time but Ed Carpenter drove for nines races starting at the 2011 Indianapolis 500. Since 2012, Dollar General is no longer a sponsor for Sarah Fisher's Sarah Fisher Racing.

Sports
Dollar General became the sponsor of the Dollar General Bowl, formerly the GoDaddy Bowl, in Mobile, Alabama on August 17, 2016. In May 2019, Dollar General withdrew its title sponsorship of the Mobile bowl game.

Merchandise
Dollar General sells products from national name brands like Clorox, Energizer, Procter & Gamble, Hanes, Coca-Cola, Mars, Unilever, Nestlé, Kimberly-Clark, Kellogg's, General Mills, and PepsiCo.

In 2018, Dollar General expanded its product offerings to include the “Better for You” assortment that aim to offer healthier options from brands like Kashi, Annie's, Back to Nature and Kind.

By the end of its 2019 fiscal year, Dollar General offered its produce assortments in more than 650 stores, with plans to expand its produce offerings to an additional 400 stores in FY 2020.

Private brands
Dollar General created its abbreviation, the letters "DG", as a store brand for "inexpensive" household products sold through the Dollar General stores; it is in the process of being phased out for most products as of the early 2020s. DG is also the company's NYSE ticker symbol.

Dollar General private brands include Clover Valley (groceries), Good & Smart (health foods), Smart & Simple (a low-end discount brand), Sweet Smiles (bulk candy), Ntense (Dollar General's in-house energy drink), Nature's Menu, Forever Pals and Heartland Farms (pet food and products, formerly EverPet), Gentle Steps (diapers, training pants and wipes), Studio Selection (beauty and skin care), Believe Beauty (beauty care and makeup), Root to End (hair care), TrueLiving (housewares and laundry), Comfort Bay (towels, blankets and pillows), Open Trails (men's apparel), Mission Ridge (blue jeans), Zone Pro (sportswear), Composure (adult diapers and incontinence pads), Breeze (feminine hygiene), ProEssentials (hardware), DriveMXD (automotive), OfficeHub (office supplies) and Bobbie Brooks (women's apparel).

Rexall

The brand name Rexall was first established in 1903 by Louis K. Liggett and gradually became a powerhouse as a pharmaceutical drug store chain. In March 2010, Dollar General became the exclusive retailer for Rexall products. Rexall vitamins and supplements began appearing at Dollar General stores in March and by fall 2010 a full line of Rexall products was available at Dollar General.

Corporate affairs

Board of directors
Dollar General Board of Directors as of June 2020 are: Michael M. Calbert (Chairman of the Board), Todd Vasos (CEO), Warren Bryant, Patricia Fili-Krushel, Timothy I. McGuire, William Rhodes III, Debra A Sandler and Ralph E. Santana.

Operations
Dollar General has more than 18,700 stores in 47 states, and approximately 158,000 employees. Dollar General also has 17 distribution centers in 16 states. Since 2017, DG has opened stores in North Dakota, Wyoming and Washington. As of early 2020, DG does not have stores in three states: Alaska, Hawaii, and Montana.

Subsidiaries

Dolgencorp
Dolgencorp is a wholly owned subsidiary of Dollar General Corporation. Dollar General brand products are manufactured under the Dolgencorp subsidiary.

Dollar General Global Sourcing
In 2004, a Dollar General office was opened in Hong Kong to oversee the global sourcing operations through exporting and importing products of Dollar General related goods.

Dollar General Literacy Foundation
Since 1993, Dollar General has provided funding of literacy and education programs through its subsidiary Dollar General Literacy Foundation. Every year the Dollar General Literacy Foundation awards funds to nonprofit organizations, schools and libraries within a 15-mile radius of a Dollar General store or distribution center. It has awarded more than $182 million in grants to literacy organizations that have helped more than 11 million individuals learn to read, prepare for the high school equivalency, or learn English.

In 2020, the Dollar General Literacy Foundation awarded $8.6 million to approximately 970 nonprofit organizations, schools and libraries, which marked its largest one-day grant announcement. The Dollar General Literacy Foundation also celebrated its 25th anniversary in 2018.

In April 2022, the Dollar General Literacy Foundation announced an approximately $9.2 million commitment to support literacy within the surrounding communities. $8.2 million has been earmarked for the spring grants to support family literacy programs across the country, while the other $1 million has been pledged to the DonorsChoose program.

Controversies

Perpetuating economic distress
Dollar General, along with other dollar store chains, while "sometimes [filling] a need in cash-strapped communities" where supermarkets have closed, are regarded not "merely a byproduct of economic distress. They’re a cause of it.” Dollar store chains, in "capitalizing on a series of powerful economic and social forces—white flight, the recent recession, the so-called “retail apocalypse”—all of which have opened up gaping holes in food access...might not be causing these inequalities per se, they appear to be perpetuating them". The rapid growth in dollar stores across the USA have created food deserts and a “dollar store belt”. Originally opened with local tax incentives, a number of municipalities have been adding zoning bylaws to discourage dollar stores. ) According to a study done by the Institute for Local Self-Reliance, dollar stores tend to create fewer and lower wage jobs than independent grocery stores. The report claims that dollar stores stifle local competition, thereby hurting the communities they are serving.

In March 2020, the retailer announced plans to expand produce assortments to approximately 400 stores in addition to the 650 stores where it is already in place during its 2020 fiscal year. In February 2019, the University of Nevada, Las Vegas published a story, which found that the quality of fruits and vegetables at dollar stores is just as good as regular grocery store produce.

Financial irregularities
On April 30, 2001, Dollar General Corp was liable for making false statements or failing to disclose adverse facts about the company's financial results, and paid $162 million for settlement. The company also announced to restate its earnings for the past three fiscal years, due to accounting irregularities including allegations of fraudulent behavior.

On March 3, 2005, Dollar General announced to restate its results for 2000 through 2003, due to a clarification of lease-accounting matters issued by the SEC.

OSHA fines
In November 2014, Dollar General was fined $51,700 by the Occupational Safety and Health Administration (OSHA) following an inspection of a Brooklyn, Mississippi, branch of the store. The statement from OSHA notes that Dollar General has had repeated health and safety violations: "Since 2009, OSHA has conducted 72 inspections of Dollar General nationwide. Of those inspections, 39 have resulted in citations." In April 2016, OSHA reported that further citations had been given to the store for exposing employees to the risk of electrical hazards due to missing face plates on electrical outlets. The store was fined $107,620. In December 2016, OSHA has noted that some Dollar General stores continued to block fire exits with merchandise disregarding safety violations resulting in several fines.
Inspections at Dollar General stores in 2022 in Pembroke in February, and Hogansville and Smyrna in March identified four willful and seven repeat violations. Specifically, OSHA cited the company for failing to keep receiving areas clean and orderly and for stacking materials in an unsafe manner. These hazards exposed workers to slips, trips and being struck by objects. OSHA also issued citations for exposing workers to fire and entrapment hazards by failing to keep exit routes and electrical panels clear and unobstructed.
Dollar General's pattern of disregarding worker safety was apparent at five other Southeast locations. In February 2022, OSHA proposed $1,048,309 in penalties after inspections at three locations in Mobile, Alabama, and one in Dalton, Georgia, found similar hazards. At another Mobile location, a December 2021 inspection led OSHA to propose $321,827 in penalties for exposing workers to slip and trip hazards and not keeping the main storeroom orderly to allow a safe exit during an emergency.

Dollar General Corp. v. Mississippi Band of Choctaw Indians

Vermont pricing irregularity fine 
In 2019 Dollar General was fined $1.75 million by the state of Vermont over pricing irregularity by charging a higher price for products at the register than was advertised at the shelf.

Ohio pricing irregularity lawsuit
During 2022 the State of Ohio brought a lawsuit for deceptive pricing.

See also
 Cal Turner
 Cal Turner Jr.
 J.L. Turner and Son Building

Further reading
 "How Dollar General Became Rural America's Store of Choice," Wall Street Journal.  Nassauer, Sarah. (December 4, 2017)

References

External links

 
 DGME  
 DGME Portal

 
Companies listed on the New York Stock Exchange
Retail companies established in 1939
Discount stores of the United States
Variety stores
Companies based in Tennessee
1939 establishments in Kentucky
2009 initial public offerings
2007 mergers and acquisitions
American companies established in 1939
Turner family
1960s initial public offerings